Francisco Herrera may refer to:

 Francisco Herrera the Elder (1576–1656), Spanish painter
 Francisco Herrera the Younger (1622–1685), his son, Spanish painter
 Francisco Herrera (baseball), Los Angeles Dodgers clubhouse staff
 Francisco Herrera (comics), comic book illustrator and co-creator of Mania